Loveless is a surname. Notable people with the surname include:

 April Loveless, the 4-year-old Texas girl whose parents were convicted of her 1989 murder, then later exonerated  
 Bruce Loveless, U.S. Naval Intelligence, Director of Intelligence Operations, NAVINT, and a central figure in a corruption scandal
 Bob Loveless, knifemaker 
 James and George Loveless, two of the Tolpuddle Martyrs
 Lily Loveless, British actress
 Lydia Loveless, American country singer
 Melinda Loveless (born 1975), one of the perpetrators of the torture-murder of Shanda Sharer
 Patty Loveless, American country singer
 Shane Loveless, Australian footballer

Fictional
 Dr. Loveless, recurring fictional character in TV series The Wild Wild West

See also
Loveless (disambiguation)